Mike Simmrin (born Michael Avrum Simmrin; July 8, 1979) is an American film and television actor.

Early life and career
Mike was born in Los Angeles, California on July 8, 1979. He has a brother, Joey Simmrin, who is also an actor. He started acting at age 11 and appeared in several TV series, such as Tales from the Crypt, for which he was nominated as the "Best Young Actor" (Young Artist Award) in 1991, Baywatch and Lost in 2004 and in films, such as Munchie in 1992 alongside Jennifer Love Hewitt, in Casper (1995), in which he gained a small role, and in Waking the Dead (2000).

Filmography
 Tales from the Crypt (1990) - TV Show - Season 2 - Episode 18
 Casper (1995) - Phantom
 Baywatch - Clay / Andy van Pelt (2 episodes, 1992)
 Munchie (1992) - Leon
 Sisters - Young John (1 episode, 1992)
 Radio Flyer (1992) - Fisher Friend #2
 Dallas - Andy Krebbs (1 episode, 1991)
 Tales from the Crypt - Theodore (1 episode, 1990)

Awards
 1991 Young Artist Award for "Best Young Actor" in a Cable Special for: Tales from the Crypt (1989)

External links
 

1979 births
Living people
20th-century American male actors
American male film actors
American male television actors
Male actors from Los Angeles